Pucciniastrum epilobii is a plant pathogen infecting fuchsias.

References

External links
 USDA ARS Fungal Database

Fungal plant pathogens and diseases
Ornamental plant pathogens and diseases
Pucciniales
Fungi described in 1861